Seminars in Cell and Developmental Biology is a bimonthly peer-reviewed scientific review journal covering cell and developmental biology. It was established in 1990 as Seminars in Cell Biology, obtaining its current name in 1996, when it incorporated Seminars in Developmental Biology (which was also established in 1990). It is published by Elsevier and the editor-in-chief is John Davey (University of Warwick). According to the Journal Citation Reports, the journal has a 2017 impact factor of 6.138.

References

External links

Developmental biology journals
Molecular and cellular biology journals
Review journals
Publications established in 1990
Bimonthly journals
Elsevier academic journals
English-language journals